Atelopus nahumae (San Lorenzo harlequin frog) is a species of toad in the family Bufonidae. It is endemic to Colombia and only known from humid montane forest of Sierra Nevada de Santa Marta in the Magdalena, La Guajira, and Cesar Departments.

Description 
Adult males measure  and females  in snout–vent length. The snout is acuminate or sub-acuminate. The tympanum is absent. The fingers have traces of basal webbing while the toes are fully (toes I to III) to partially webbed (toe IV). Skin is dorsally smooth but bears  granules, small conical tubers, and small warts. Dorsal coloration is dark or light brown, with our without spots. There is a brown X-mark in the supra-scapular area. Some specimens have a dark-brown mid-dorsal line.

Habitat and conservation 
It can also be found in closed-canopy secondary forests and riparian forests. Breeds takes place in streams.

This species is only known from four locations. Aggregations appear very localized, with nearby, suitable habitat uninhabited. It is potentially threatened by chytridiomycosis (although as of 2014, the disease has not been detected in Sierra Nevada de Santa Marta) and by habitat loss caused by agriculture and logging. The species occurs within the Parque Nacional Natural Sierra Nevada de Santa Marta as well as the adjacent El Dorado Nature Reserve.

References 

nahumae
Frogs of South America
Endemic fauna of Colombia
Amphibians of Colombia
Sierra Nevada de Santa Marta
Endangered animals
Endangered biota of South America
Amphibians described in 1994
Taxonomy articles created by Polbot